Anita is an unincorporated community in Jefferson County, Pennsylvania, United States.

History
A post office has been in operation at Anita since 1891. Anita was originally a mining community.

References

Unincorporated communities in Jefferson County, Pennsylvania
Unincorporated communities in Pennsylvania